Norwin High School is a public high school  located in North Huntingdon, Pennsylvania, with a current enrollment of about 1,600 students in grades 9-12.  It enrolls students from North Huntingdon Township, Irwin, and North Irwin. It is part of the Norwin School District.

History
In 1914, the Township of North Huntingdon, and the borough of Irwin and North Irwin signed a Jointure, combining the three schools. The original high school (now Queen of Angels Catholic School) was built in 1916, and was named Norwin Union High School. An Annex was added to the building in 1937, which survives today. The west wing of the building burned in 1944, and severed the jointure between North Huntingdon, Irwin and North Irwin Schools. The remaining annex was turned into North Huntingdon High School. In 1950, a new West Wing was built, and in 1958 the Jointure between Irwin, North Irwin, and North Huntingdon was reinstated.

By 1964, the new high school building was being out grown by its students, so the school board approved the purchase of the McMahon Farm. The current high school was built in 1965. The current building underwent a massive renovation which was completed in 2006.

Awards
The Norwin Band has won the state championship a record 30 times, most recently winning in 2019. The Norwin band is also the only band in the country to win Bands of America regionals in each of the past five decades (1970's-present). The band has a total of 30 Bands of America regional championships which is the most held by any band in the country. It also won the 1982 Bands of America Grand National Championships.

The school's theater department has received 55 awards within the state for technical theater and performance. The Norwin Theater Club was named "Best in State" for 2007.

Notable alumni
Doug Plank (1971) — former safety for The Ohio State University and National Football League’s Chicago Bears; held various coaching positions in the National Football League and Arena Football League following his playing career

Mark Critz (1980) — former U.S. Representative for Pennsylvania's 12th congressional district

Paul Doucette (1990) — drummer, rhythm guitarist, and backing vocalist for Matchbox Twenty; lead vocalist of The Break and Repair Method

Colleen Joy Shogan (1993) — author, academic, and historian; current nominee to serve as the Archivist of the United States

J. J. Matijevic (2014) — first baseman for Major League Baseball’s Houston Astros; played for the University of Arizona

Extracurriculars
Norwin High School offers a wide variety of extracurricular activities.

Sports
Nineteen varsity level sports are provided including: Baseball,  Softball, Lacrosse Boys, Basketball Boys & Girls, Soccer Boys & Girls, Cross Country Boys & Girls, Swimming Boys & Girls, track Boys & Girls, Golf Boys & Girls, Volleyball Boys & Girls, Tennis Boys & Girls, Field Hockey, Football and Wrestling. Bowling and Ice Hockey are club sports.

Band

The band is a twenty-nine time Bands of America (BOA) Regional Championship champion. The Norwin band was also the first band to win two regionals in one season as well as the first band to win three regionals in one season (1980) and (2012) respectively. The band has also won the 1982 Bands of America Grand National Championship, the only band from Pennsylvania to do so. They have also qualified for the BOA finals in 1981, 1983, 1984, 1985, 1987, and 1989, and Norwin Senior High School qualified for the finals in 1990. In 2015, the ensemble placed first in class 6-Open in the USBands Open Class National Championships in East Rutherford, New Jersey and earned the award for best music.
In 2021, The Norwin Band won the class 2A National Championship along with the awards for Outstanding Music performance and outstanding visual performance at the Bands of America Grand National Championship.

Norwin's World Guard has placed in the World Guard International (WGI) Scholastic World Class Finals Seven times.

References

External links
Norwin School District

School buildings completed in 1937
Educational institutions established in 1969
Education in Pittsburgh area
Public high schools in Pennsylvania
Schools in Westmoreland County, Pennsylvania
1916 establishments in Pennsylvania